The Aberdeen Roughnecks are an American football club based in Aberdeen, Aberdeenshire, Scotland, who compete in the BAFA National Leagues NFC 1 Scotland, the second level of British American Football. The 
team operate from the Sports field within Hazlehead Park that they nickname "The Rig". They were formed in 2012 and after progressing out of Associate status they debuted in the 2014 season. The club have paid homage to the previous Aberdeen-based side the Granite City Oilers and have considered themselves a continuation of the Oilers.

The Roughnecks represent the most northern based team currently operating within the BAFANL, in 2018 they were crowned NFC 2 North champions and completed a perfect season when they defeated the Chester Romans in the Division Two Bowl game.

History
Aberdeen had an American football team before the Roughnecks, with the Granite City Oilers running from February 1986. The original team enjoyed some success, winning their conference in 1989 and again in 1993 before they disbanded in 1995.

The club began with a few fans of the sport meeting in Seaton Park to throw a ball around. Joint training camps and scrimmages followed with the Highland Wildcats adult side, giving the players a taste of game action.

The Roughnecks now had a head coach in place, and enough players to apply for associate membership of the British American Football Association (BAFA), taking their first step to entering the UK's league structure. Additionally, the club acquired a home field in Hazlehead Park, named The Rig, and installed goals to host home games.

To fulfill the conditions of full membership, the club played 3 matches towards the end of the year: the Glasgow Tigers and Clyde Valley Blackhawks visited The Rig, before the team travelled south to face the Dundee Hurricanes. Despite suffering losses in all 3 games, the Roughnecks proved that they were competitive enough and ready to enter the BAFA National Leagues, and were voted in as full members of BAFA at the body's AGM in November 2013.

Embarking on their first BAFA National Leagues (BAFANL) campaign, the Roughnecks experienced a difficult rookie season, losing their first 8 games before finishing with a maiden victory over the Glasgow Tigers and a tie with the Dundee Hurricanes. Completing the first season successfully allowed the club to set a base from which to build on looking ahead, and they were successful in attracting over 80 potential players to 2015 pre-season training camps.

The club's second BAFA National Leagues (BAFANL) campaign brought greater success, finishing the regular season with a winning 6–4 record and securing a wildcard playoff spot as the NFC's #8 seed. As well as progress made in the senior ranks, the Roughnecks youth side competed in their respective league for the first time, after an initial recruitment drive was successful in attracting enough players.

Junior and Youth Programme
As full members of BAFA, the Roughnecks have now launched a youth development programme (commenced November 2014), as mandated by the governing body. This will initially take the form of a youth team (14–17 years old), with a junior team (17–19 years old) expected to follow at some stage in the future.

Stadium

The Roughnecks home field is situated in Hazlehead Park, beside the Joe Paterson Sports Pavilion and its assorted football pitches. Training is also held here every non-playing Sunday from 1pm until 4pm.

Results

2013

2014

2015

2016

References

External links
Official site
Facebook page
Twitter page

BAFA National League teams
Sports teams in Aberdeen
American football teams in Scotland
2012 establishments in Scotland
American football teams established in 2012